Japan competed at the 2022 Winter Olympics in Beijing, China, from 4 to 20 February 2022.

Akito Watabe and Arisa Go were the country's flagbearers during the opening ceremony. Meanwhile Go was also the flagbearer during the closing ceremony.

Medalists

The following Japanese competitors won medals at the games. In the discipline sections below, the medalists' names are bolded.

Competitors
The following is the list of number of competitors participating at the Games per sport/discipline.

Alpine skiing

Biathlon

Mixed

Cross-country skiing

Japan qualified four male and four female cross-country skiers.

Men

Women

Sprint

Curling

Summary

Women's tournament

Japan has qualified their women's team (five athletes), by finishing second in the 2021 Olympic Qualification Event. Team Satsuki Fujisawa qualified as Japanese representatives by winning the 2021 Japanese Olympic Curling Trials, defeating Sayaka Yoshimura 3–2 in the best-of-five trial.

Round robin
Japan had a bye in draws 2, 6 and 10.

Draw 1
Thursday, 10 February, 9:05

Draw 3
Friday, 11 February, 14:05

Draw 4
Saturday, 12 February, 9:05

Draw 5
Saturday, 12 February, 20:05

Draw 7
Monday, 14 February, 9:05

Draw 8
Monday, 14 February, 20:05

Draw 9
Tuesday, 15 February, 14:05

Draw 11
Wednesday, 16 February, 20:05

Draw 12
Thursday, 17 February, 14:05

Semifinal
Friday, 18 February, 20:05

Gold medal game
Sunday, 20 February, 9:05

Figure skating

In the 2021 World Figure Skating Championships in Stockholm, Sweden, Japan secured three quotas in both the men's and ladies singles competitions, and one each in the pairs and ice dance competitions.

Team trophy

Freestyle skiing 

Freeskiing
Women
Kokone Kondo withdrew from the slopestyle event after sustaining an injury during practice.

Moguls
Men

Women

Ski cross

Ice hockey

Summary
Key:
 OT – Overtime
 GWS – Match decided by penalty-shootout

Japan has qualified  23 female competitors to the ice hockey tournament.

Women's tournament

Japan women's national ice hockey team qualified by being 6th in the 2020 IIHF World Rankings.

Team roster

Group play

Quarterfinals

Luge

Nordic combined

Short track speed skating

Japan has qualified four male and three female short track speed skaters.  They will participate in the men's and mixed relays as well.

Men

Women

Mixed

Qualification legend: ADV – Advanced due to being impeded by another skater; FA – Qualify to medal round; FB – Qualify to consolation round; OR – Olympic record

Ski jumping 

Men

Women

Mixed

Snowboarding

Freestyle
Men

Women

Parallel

Cross

Speed skating

Men

Women

Mass start

Team pursuit

See also
Japan at the 2022 Winter Paralympics

References

Nations at the 2022 Winter Olympics
2022
Winter Olympics